Eberhard Rausch (born 11 December 1947 in Mannheim) is a former German pair skater.

With partner Corinna Halke, he is the 1974–1976 German national champion. They competed five times at the European Figure Skating Championships and the World Figure Skating Championships. They placed 10th at the 1972 Winter Olympics and 8th at the 1976 Winter Olympics.

With partner Brunhilde Bassler, he is the 1970 German national champion.

Competitive highlights

Pairs with Brunhilde Bassler

Pairs with Corinna Halke

References
 ISU statistics
 IOC – Winter Olympics 1976

1947 births
German male pair skaters
Olympic figure skaters of Germany
Figure skaters at the 1972 Winter Olympics
Figure skaters at the 1976 Winter Olympics
Living people
Sportspeople from Mannheim